Folashade Mejabi Yemi-Esan  (née Mejabi; born 13 August 1964), is a Nigerian civil servant and the current head of the civil service of the federation, since 28 February 2020. She was sworn in by the president of Nigeria, Muhammadu Buhari on 4 March 2020.

Early life and education
Yemi-Esan was born in Kaduna State, Nigeria. She is from Ikoyi, Ijumu, Kogi State. She had her primary school education at Bishop Smith School, Ilorin and preceded to Federal Government College, Ilorin for her secondary school education. She went to University of Ibadan, where she graduated in 1987 as the best dental surgery student. She later got a certificate in health planning and management, before obtaining a master's degree in public and international administration.

Career
Yemi-Esan started her career at the Federal Ministry of Health in Nigeria, before she was promoted to the position of Director. During her time in the health ministry, she served as liaison officer West Africa Health Organisation (WAHO), coordinator of oral health in schools programme and director of health planning research and statistics.

In 2012, she was promoted to the position of Federal Permanent Secretary, serving as the Permanent Secretary of Service Policy and Strategy Office of the Head of civil service of the federation, Federal Ministry of Information and Culture, Federal Ministry of Education and Federal Ministry of Petroleum Resources.

Head of the civil service
On 18 September 2019, she was appointed as the acting head of civil service of the federation by the president of Nigeria, Muhammadu Buhari, replacing the suspended Winifred Ekanem Oyo-Ita.

On 28 February 2020, she was made the permanent head of civil service of the federation and was sworn into office on 4 March 2020.

Awards
In October 2022, a Nigerian national honour of Commander of the Order of the Federal Republic (CFR) was conferred on her by President Muhammadu Buhari.

References

Living people
1964 births
People from Kogi State
Nigerian civil servants
University of Ibadan alumni